The 1926 Maine Black Bears football team was an American football team that represented the University of Maine as a member of the New England Conference during the 1926 college football season. In its sixth season under head coach Fred Brice, the team compiled a 7–1 record and played its home games at Alumni Field in Orono, Maine. Paul Lamoreau was the team captain.

Schedule

References

Maine
Maine Black Bears football seasons
Maine football